is a Japanese footballer who plays as a  goalkeeper for  club Kawasaki Frontale.

Career
After four years at Juntendo University, Kamifukumoto first became a Special Designated Player, then a regular for Oita Trinita in 2012. He was first loaned to FC Machida Zelvia, but he never had a chance to play as a professional athlete until 2015.

During his first season as a field player, he appeared nine times on the playing field. However, Oita Trinita was relegated to the J3 League. His role model as a player is Iker Casillas.

Club statistics
.

References

External links
Profile at Tokyo Verdy
Profile at Oita Trinita

1989 births
Living people
Juntendo University alumni
Association football people from Chiba Prefecture
Japanese footballers
J1 League players
J2 League players
J3 League players
Japan Football League players
Oita Trinita players
FC Machida Zelvia players
Tokyo Verdy players
Tokushima Vortis players
Kyoto Sanga FC players
Kawasaki Frontale players
Association football goalkeepers